A cold start is an attempt to start a vehicle's engine when it is cold, relative to its normal operating temperature, often due to normal cold weather. A cold start situation is commonplace, as weather conditions in most climates will naturally be at a lower temperature than the typical operating temperature of an engine.

Diesel engines have more difficulty starting at low outside temperatures than gasoline engines. That is because diesel is a thicker fuel than gasoline and contains more oil than petrol. Due to low outside temperatures, the diesel becomes thicker and therefore burns less efficient.

Causes of cold starts 
Cold starts are more difficult than starting a vehicle that has been run recently (typically between 90 minutes and 2 hours). More effort is needed to turn over a cold engine for multiple reasons:
 The engine compression is higher as the lack of heat makes ignition more difficult
 Low temperatures cause engine oil to become more viscous, making it more difficult to circulate the oil. 
 Air becomes more dense the cooler it is. This affects the air-fuel ratio, which in turn affects the flammability of the mixture.
 Fuel becomes thicker because the oil in the fuel is thicker at low temperatures (most common in diesel engines).

Solutions to cold starting 
The problem of cold starting has been greatly reduced since the introduction of engine starters, which are now commonplace on all modern vehicles. The higher revs that can be achieved using electric starter motors improves the chance of successful ignition.

Starting fluid, a volatile liquid, is sometimes sprayed into the combustion chamber of an engine to assist the starting procedure.

Diesel engines make use of glow plugs to heat the combustion chamber prior to ignition, improving the conditions inside the engine, while certain manufacturers have incorporated a block heater, which heats the engine block prior to ignition to reduce the problem of cold starting.

In the early 1940s diesel engines fitted in tractors are started by use of a flamethrower to heat up the air that goes into the cylinder. That way the cylinder was heated so that the diesel could ignite more easily.

References 

Starting systems

Diesel engines
Gasoline engines